Metro is a public transportation network consisting of light rail and bus rapid transit services covering the Minneapolis–Saint Paul metropolitan area. The light rail portion of the network, managed by Metro Transit, has 37 light rail stations in operation across two lines: the Blue Line, running from downtown Minneapolis to the Mall of America in Bloomington, Minnesota, and the Green Line, connecting downtown Minneapolis to downtown Saint Paul. In 2016, the Blue and Green lines respectively provided approximately 10.3 million and 12.7 million rides for a total of 23 million rides across both lines. By ridership, it is the ninth-largest light rail system in the United States.

Construction on the Blue Line, which was initially known as the Hiawatha Line, began in 2001. The line opened in two phases in 2004, beginning with a 12-station stretch from the Warehouse District/Hennepin Avenue station through the Fort Snelling station in June. In December, five more stations were opened, continuing service south of Fort Snelling to the Mall of America station. Two additional Blue Line stations opened in late 2009: a new northern terminus at Target Field and the American Boulevard station in Bloomington. Construction on the Green Line, which was initially designated as the Central Corridor, began in 2010. The line opened in its entirety in June 2014.

Fares for Metro light rail service are the same as those for most Metro Transit bus services and include unlimited transfers to other light rail and bus routes within 2.5 hours from the time a fare is paid. Two exceptions exist for Metro light rail services: fares within (but not between) downtown zones are less expensive than regular fares but may not be transferred; and there is no cost to ride between terminals 1 and 2 at the Minneapolis–Saint Paul International Airport (MSP). Many stations connect with rail or bus routes. The Target Field station provides a connection to the Northstar commuter rail line, while the Mall of America station allows for transfers to the Metro Red Line bus rapid transit service. The A Line bus rapid transit line connects with the 46th Street Blue Line station and the Snelling Avenue Green Line stop. Two Metro light rail stations – 30th Avenue and Fort Snelling – have designated park and ride lots.

Extensions to both Metro lines are planned as of September 2017. The Blue Line extension will branch northward from the Target Field station, adding 11 stations to the line: two more in Minneapolis, two in Golden Valley, one each in Robbinsdale and Crystal, and five in Brooklyn Park. The Green Line extension will branch west from Target Field station and include 16 new stations: five in Minneapolis, three each in Saint Louis Park and Hopkins, one in Minnetonka, and four in Eden Prairie. In 2018, Streets.mn reported that the Blue Line extension was officially projected to be open in 2023, with the Green Line extension expected to be ready for passenger service the following year. However, while work on the Green Line extension was underway, an issue with securing right-of-way resulted in the need to rework the Blue Line extension's route which may delay the project's completion.

Stations

Lines

Planned stations

Deferred/cancelled stations
Along Southwest LRT, two additional stations, both in Eden Prairie, were originally included in plans for the Green Line extension. One, Mitchell Road, was cut entirely from plans while another, Eden Prairie Town Center, was deferred until a later date. In October 2018, Eden Prairie Town Center received a full funding grant agreement and will open with the rest of the line when it is complete. Along Bottineau LRT, four planned stations (Van White Boulevard, Penn Avenue, Plymouth Avenue/Theodore Wirth Park, and Golden Valley Road) were abandoned after BNSF Railway refused access to their Monticello Subdivision, forcing Metro Transit and the Metropolitain Council to find an alternative alignment. Three other stations (Robbinsdale, Bass Lake Road, and 63rd Avenue) also along the Monticello Subdivision are still being pursued, albeit outside the railroad corridor.

Notes

References

External links

 Metro Blue Line at Metrotransit.org
 Metro Green Line at Metrotransit.org

 
 
Lists of railway stations in the United States
Lists of metro stations
Minnesota transportation-related lists
Metro
Metro Transit (Minnesota)